Ariel Rubinstein (Hebrew: אריאל רובינשטיין; born April 13, 1951) is an Israeli economist who works in economic theory, game theory and bounded rationality.

Biography
Ariel Rubinstein is a professor of economics at the School of Economics at Tel Aviv University and the Department of Economics at New York University.  He studied mathematics and economics at the Hebrew University of Jerusalem, 1972–1979 (B.Sc. Mathematics, Economics and Statistics, 1974;
M.A. Economics, 1975; M.Sc Mathematics, 1976; Ph.D. Economics, 1979).

In 1982, he published "Perfect equilibrium in a bargaining model", an important contribution to the theory of bargaining.  The model is known also as a Rubinstein bargaining model. It describes two-person bargaining as an extensive game with perfect information in which the players alternate offers.  A key assumption is that the players are impatient. The main result gives conditions under which the game has a unique subgame perfect equilibrium and characterizes this equilibrium.

Honours and awards
Rubinstein was elected a member of the Israel Academy of Sciences and Humanities (1995), a Foreign Honorary Member of the American Academy of Arts and Sciences in (1994) and the American Economic Association (1995). In 1985 he was elected a fellow of the Econometric Society, and served as its president in 2004.

In 2002, he was awarded an honorary doctorate by the Tilburg University.

He has received the Bruno Prize (2000), the Israel Prize for economics (2002), the Nemmers Prize in Economics (2004), the EMET Prize (2006). and the Rothschild Prize (2010).

Published works
 Bargaining and Markets, with Martin J. Osborne, Academic Press 1990
 A Course in Game Theory, with Martin J. Osborne, MIT Press, 1994.
 Modeling Bounded Rationality, MIT Press, 1998.
 Economics and Language, Cambridge University Press, 2000.
 Lecture Notes in Microeconomic Theory: The Economic Agent, Princeton University Press, 2006.
 Economic Fables, Open Book Publishers, 2012.
 AGADOT HAKALKALA (heb.), Kineret, Zmora, Bitan, 2009.

See also
 List of Israel Prize recipients

References

External links
 Personal Web site
 Nash lecture
 

1951 births
Living people
Game theorists
20th-century  Israeli economists
21st-century  Israeli economists
Israel Prize in economics recipients
Fellows of the American Academy of Arts and Sciences
Corresponding Fellows of the British Academy
Fellows of the Econometric Society
Academic staff of Tel Aviv University
Presidents of the Econometric Society
Members of the Israel Academy of Sciences and Humanities
Members of the European Academy of Sciences and Arts
Behavioral economists
Nancy L. Schwartz Memorial Lecture speakers
New York University faculty